Angélica Gavaldón Loaiza (born 3 October 1973) is a Mexican retired tennis player.

Gavaldón has dual nationality, was born in the United States and comes from a Mexican family, and turned pro in 1990. That same year, she qualified for the quarterfinals in the 1990 Australian Open, from which she was eliminated in a match against Claudia Porwik. Her greatest career achievement is widely considered to be the 1995 Australian Open, when she again came through the qualifying tournament to reach the quarter-finals; this helped raise her year-end ranking for 1995 to 36th in the world and marked the peak of her Grand Slam. Her one tournament win came in Tashkent in June 1997. She played for Mexico in the Federation Cup from 1990 to 1997, and at the Olympic Games in 1992 and 1996.

Since retiring in 2000, Gavaldon has become a coach to other tennis players, and she released her own clothing label Angalo Activewear in 2007.

ITF finals

Singles: 4 (3-1)

Doubles: 1 (1-0)

References

External links
 
 
 

1973 births
Living people
Mexican female tennis players
American emigrants to Mexico
Tennis players at the 1992 Summer Olympics
Tennis players at the 1996 Summer Olympics
Olympic tennis players of Mexico